Rampage Through Time is an 2000 action game developed by Avalanche Software and published by Midway Games. It is the fourth game in the Rampage series and a sequel to 1999's Rampage 2: Universal Tour. In the game, seven previous Scumlabs monsters and one new one use a time machine to rampage through time.

Plot

The world is yet again rebuilding after the events of Universal Tour. To speed up the cleaning process, the evil and corrupt Scumlabs creates a time machine to send employees back in time to deal with the destruction without having to do so in the present. Unfortunately, monsters from the previous games (George the ape, Lizzie the dinosaur, Ralph the wolfman, Boris the rhino, Curtis the rat and Ruby the lobster), have somehow returned to Earth, this time joined by a new monster: Harley the warthog. They surprise Scumlabs and enter the time machine, and begin terrorizing the past, present, and future, bringing mayhem to the space-time continuum. Later, a UFO-like craft is created to stop the monsters, only to fail. Eventually, the monsters are finally defeated.

Gameplay
In Campaign Mode, each time zone consists of four stages. The first three consist of traditional Rampage gameplay, in that the player must destroy all the buildings in each city while avoiding attacks from enemy forces. Campaign Mode is only playable with one player, but the CPU will randomly select two other monsters to oppose the player in that time zone. After each city is destroyed, all three monsters are awarded stars for inflicting the most damage on buildings, people, and each other.

The fourth stage is a multiplayer minigame that varies with each time zone, usually as a parody of games such as Asteroids or Breakout. In Campaign Mode, the player must win these minigames in order to continue with the main game. The stars earned in the Rampage stages are also translated into extra points for the minigames, making it important to earn as many as possible to increase the chances of winning.

Reception

The game received "unfavorable" reviews according to the review aggregation website GameRankings.

References

External links
 

2000 video games
Cancelled Nintendo 64 games
PlayStation (console) games
PlayStation (console)-only games
T
Video games about time travel
Video games set in Iran
Video games set in ancient China
Video games set in Michigan
Video games set in Japan
Video games set in Kansas
Video games set in Arizona
Video games set in Italy
Video games set in the British Empire
Video games set in Alaska
Video games set in medieval England
Video games set in Atlantis
Video games set in Greece
Video games set in France
Video games set in the Philippines
Video games set in Peru
Video games set in prehistory
Video games set in the 19th century
Video games set in the 22nd century
Video games set in the 1920s
Video games set in 1943
Video games set in 2000
Video games set in the 2030s
Video games set in the Middle Ages
Video games set in the future
Video game sequels
Video games developed in the United States